Union Day is a public holiday in Myanmar, marking the anniversary of the historic Panglong Agreement in 1947.

See also 
Panglong Agreement
Panglong Conference

References 

History of Myanmar
Observances set by the Burmese calendar
Lists of events in Myanmar
Public holidays in Myanmar